Lawrence Wong is a Malaysian-born Singaporean actor. After his role in Story of Yanxi Palace (2018), Wong was ranked 35th in the list of most influential artistes in China.

Early life 
Lawrence Wong was born on 5 August 1988 in Johor Bahru, Johor, Malaysia to a Singaporean father. Wong studied at RMIT University in Australia, and graduated with a degree in mass communications. Wong acquired Singaporean citizenship circa 2016.

Career
In his early years as an actor since 2002, Wong's early roles were limited to minor roles in dramas. Wong had also portrayed real-life convicted murderer Lee Chor Pet, who kidnapped and murdered a rich businessman's teenage son in Singapore in 1968 and later executed in 1973, for which Lee's case was re-enacted and featured in Singapore's local crime show True Files.

Wong's notable minor roles in his career came from dramas like Three Wishes, 118, The Dream Job and Zero Calling .

In The Promise, a Channel U telemovie, he played a rebellious teen who falls in love with an intellectually-disabled girl. Lawrence was nominated for "Favourite Male Character" at the Star Awards 2010.

In 2016, he signed on with a Chinese management company run by Chinese actress Qin Lan and was selected for a role in Love And Passion, a remake of the 1982 TVB classic.

He was cast in Story of Yanxi Palace which aired in 2018, as Hai Lan Cha, for which he received two international awards.

Wong appeared in My One in a Million on Mediacorp Channel 8 in a lead role, replacing Aloysius Pang who died in a military accident.

Discography

Album

Single

Music Video

Filmography

Television series

Film

Public Service Announcement Short Film

Starred Music Video

Programmes

Host

Ad and Brand Endorsement

Honours & Awards

Film &TV Awards

Media And Entertainment Platform Awards

References

External links

1988 births
Living people
Singaporean television personalities
Malaysian people of Chinese descent
Malaysian emigrants to Singapore
21st-century Singaporean male actors
21st-century Malaysian male actors